Eremobates polhemusi is a species of Solifugae in the family Eremobatidae. It is endemic to Utah, United States.

References

Solifugae
Articles created by Qbugbot
Animals described in 1988